Aisam-ul-Haq Qureshi and Jean-Julien Rojer were the defending champions but lost in the final to Santiago González and Scott Lipsky, 3–6, 6–4, [7–10].

Seeds

Draw

Draw

References

 Main Draw

Doubles